The 1974–75 San Antonio Spurs season was the second season for the San Antonio Spurs.
The Spurs made their debut on October 18, 1974, vs the Indiana Pacers in Indiana, winning 129–121 in double overtime. Afterwards, the Spurs would win the next two games, getting to a quick start. In December they would be 21–18 after finishing 7–10 in the month (with a 5 gaming losing streak at one point and even firing their coach midway in the season), but they would win 30 of their last 45 games (having 7-game winning streak at one point), finishing with over 50 victories for the first time in Spurs history.  In the 1975 ABA Playoffs, the Spurs once again lost in the first round 4–2 to the Indiana Pacers.

ABA Draft

Regular season

Schedule

Season standings

Roster

ABA Playoffs
Western Division Semifinals

References

External links 
 RememberTheABA.com 1974–75 regular season and playoff results
 RememberTheABA.com San Antonio Spurs page
 RememberTheABA.com 1974–75 game by game results
 Spurs on Basketball Reference

San Antonio Spurs seasons
San Antonio
San Antonio
San Antonio